Etsaut is a commune in the Pyrénées-Atlantiques department in south-western France.

Its station on the Pau–Canfranc railway was closed after an accident in 1970.

See also
Communes of the Pyrénées-Atlantiques department

References

Communes of Pyrénées-Atlantiques